Sidney E. Berger is an American educator, librarian, and scholar who has worked and published extensively in literature, librarianship, and bibliography and the book arts, with a primary focus on papermaking, paper history, watermarks, and paper decoration.

Education 

Born in Brooklyn, NY, and raised in Los Angeles, CA, Berger received his B.A. from the University of California, Berkeley in 1965, his M.A. and PhD from the University of Iowa in 1971, and his M.S. / L.I.S. at the University of Illinois, Urbana-Champaign in 1987.

Career 

Since 2003 he has been Adjunct Professor in the School of Library and Information Science at Simmons University and Adjunct Professor in the iSchool / School of Library and Information Science at the University of Illinois, Urbana-Champaign. In both schools he teaches courses in rare books, special collections, and bibliography. At Simmons, he also teaches a course in editing in the Department of Communications.

As an English professor he taught at the University of California, Davis, and as an adjunct at the University of California, Riverside. From 1987 to 1990, Berger was Head of Printed Books and Head of Manuscripts at the American Antiquarian Society. He was Head of Special Collections and University Archivist at the University of California, Riverside from 1990 until 2000. From 2000 to 2003, he was the Head of the California Center for the Book, based at UCLA, where he was Adjunct Professor in their Library School.

Berger was the Ann C. Pingree Director of the Phillips Library at the Peabody Essex Museum from 2007 to 2014, and is now Director Emeritus of that library.

Publications 

His notable books are:

 A Norton Critical Edition of Mark Twain’s Pudd’nhead Wilson and Those Extraordinary Twins (New York: Norton, 1980; 2nd ed. New York: Norton, 2004)
 Medieval English Drama: A Bibliography of Recent Criticism.  New York: Garland Publishers, 1990; second issue in the series Routledge Library Editions: The Medieval World; Volume 4.  London and New York: Routledge, 2018 
 The Design of Bibliographies: Observations, References, and Examples. London: Mansell Publishers; Westport, CT: Greenwood, 1991 
 Paper Terms: A Thesaurus for Use in Rare Book and Special Collections Cataloguing.  Chicago: Association of College and Research Libraries, American Library Association, 1990; author/compiler; thesaurus issued by the Bibliographical Standards Committee 
 The Anatomy of a Literary Hoax.  New Castle, DE: Oak Knoll Books, 1994 
 Fleuronologia.  Northampton, Massachusetts: Gehenna Press, 1996 
 Printing and the Mind of Merker: A Bibliographical Study. New York: The Grolier Club, 1997 
 The Magical Painted Papers of Eric Carle. Northampton, Massachusetts: Gehenna Press, 1997 
 The Hand Made Papers of Japan.  North Hills, PA: Bird & Bull Press, 2001 
 Forty-Four Years of Bird & Bull: A Bibliography, 1958-2002.  Compiled by Sidney E. Berger. North Hills, PA: Bird & Bull Press, 2002 
 Karli Frigge’s Life in Marbling. North Hills, PA: Bird & Bull Press, 2004 
 Edward Seymour and the Fancy Paper Company. New Castle, DE: Oak Knoll Press, 2006 
 [As editor and author of introduction] Marbled and Paste Papers: Rosamond Loring’s Recipe Book, Cambridge, MA: Houghton Library, Harvard University, 2007
 Chiyogami Papers.  North Hills, PA: Bird & Bull Press, 2011 
 Rare Books and Special Collections.  Chicago: Neal-Schuman, American Library Association, 2014; winner of the 2015 ABC Clio / American Library Association award for Best Book in Library Literature, 2015 
 The Dictionary of the Book: A Glossary for Book Collectors, Booksellers, Librarians, and Others.  Lanham: Rowman & Littlefield, 2016
 The Book of Death. Waban, MA: Doe Press, 2017 
 [As editor]  Josef Halfer and the Revival of the Art of Marbling Paper, by Richard J. Wolfe.  New Castle, DE: Oak Knoll Press, 2018.

Since 2003, Berger has published about 100 scholarly articles, and he has been the “Decorated Paper” columnist for Hand Papermaking Newsletter for which publication he has written over 60 articles.

With his wife Michèle V. Cloonan he is the proprietor of the Doe Press, which has published fine-press books including: Thom Gunn. Lament. 1985; Ernest Kroll. Six Letters to An Apprentice. 1994; Donald Justice. Banjo Dog. 1995, and Michele V. Cloonan, The Invisible Presence of Gertrude Stiles, 2010.

Also with Michèle V. Cloonan, he amassed a collection of over 22,000 pieces of paper, now the Berger-Cloonan Collection of Decorated Paper at the Cushing Library, Texas A&M University.

References 

Living people
21st-century American historians
21st-century American male writers
Year of birth missing (living people)
American male non-fiction writers